Gymnastics events were competed at the 1963 Pan American Games in São Paulo, Brazil.


Medal table

Medalists

Men's events

Women's events

See also
 Pan American Gymnastics Championships
 South American Gymnastics Championships
 Gymnastics at the 1964 Summer Olympics

References 
  .
 
 

1963
1963 Pan American Games
International gymnastics competitions hosted by Brazil